The rivalry between Yadanarbon F.C. and Yangon United F.C. is a notable rivalry in Myanmar football as both clubs are recognised as having great  history and traditions.
Although the two clubs have frequently been in the same division as each other since 2009, the rivalry has largely arisen before 2009.
The rivalry has been noted for on-field trouble, particularly the contests in 2009, culminating in 2014 and 2015.

Origins
In 2009 MNL Cup, Yangon United met Yadanarbon drew 2–2 for first time ever. In 2009 MNL Cup final, they met again. They drew 2–2 again and Yadanarbon won in penalty(4–1). Yadanarbon won their first time ever MNL Cup Champion.

Football rivalry
See also: Yadanarbon F.C. and Yangon United F.C.

Both clubs have enjoyed periods of dominance over Myanmar Football. Yadanarbon dominated Myanmar Football from 2009 to 2011, winning 2 MNL league championships and 1 AFC President's Cup. Likewise, Yangon United dominated Myanmar Football from 2011 to 2015,winning 4 league championships and 1 MFF Cup. During their respective period of dominance both clubs enjoyed several seasons in which they won multiple trophy in domestic and AFC President's Cup.

Honours

Table correct as of 28 March 2019

Player Transfer

Meet in MNL Season

References

External links
2018 Myanmar National League

Association football rivalries
Football in Myanmar
2009 establishments in Myanmar